Bni Bouifrour or Ait Bouifrour (Riffian-Berber: ⴰⵢⵜ ⴱⵡⵉⴼⵔⵓⵔ) is a commune in the Nador Province of the Oriental administrative region of Morocco. At the time of the 2004 census, the commune had a total population of 17090 people living in 3537 households.

Notable people 
Oussama Assaidi - Moroccan footballer
Ahmed Marcouch - Moroccan-Dutch politician

References

Populated places in Nador Province
Rural communes of Oriental (Morocco)